is an Echizen Railway Katsuyama Eiheiji Line train station located in the town of Eiheiji, Yoshida District, Fukui Prefecture, Japan.

Lines

Station layout
The station consists of two opposed side platforms connected by a level crossing. The station is unattended.

Adjacent stations

History
Domeki Station was opened on February 11, 1914. Operations were halted from June 25, 2001. The station reopened on July 20, 2003 as an Echizen Railway station.

Surrounding area
The station is near a small cluster of homes. 
Other points of interest to the north include:
 Kuzuryū River

See also
 List of railway stations in Japan

External links

  

Railway stations in Fukui Prefecture
Railway stations in Japan opened in 1914
Katsuyama Eiheiji Line
Eiheiji, Fukui